Horní Bradlo is a municipality and village in Chrudim District in the Pardubice Region of the Czech Republic. It has about 400 inhabitants.

Administrative parts
Villages of Dolní Bradlo, Javorné, Lipka, Travná, Velká Střítež and Vršov are administrative parts of Horní Bradlo.

References

External links

Villages in Chrudim District